The Platysticta serendibica is a species of damselfly in the family Platystictidae. It is endemic to wet zone forests of Kanneliya area, Sri Lanka.

See also
 List of odonates of Sri Lanka

References

Damselflies of Sri Lanka
Insects described in 2016